This is a list of Presbyterian and Reformed denominations in North America. There are more than 6 million Presbyterians in North America.

Presbyterian denominations

Larger Presbyterian denominations
Associate Reformed Presbyterian Church - around 22,459 members (2018) - Orthodox, Presbyterian, Calvinist, Covenanter & Seceder 
Bible Presbyterian Church - around 3,500 members - Orthodox, Presbyterian, Calvinist
partially: Communion of Reformed Evangelical Churches - around 15,000 members - Evangelical/Orthodox, Dutch Reformed/Presbyterian, Calvinist
Cumberland Presbyterian Church - around 65,087 members (2019) - Liberal, Presbyterian, Arminian
Cumberland Presbyterian Church in America - around 6,500 members - Liberal, Presbyterian, Arminian
Evangelical Assembly of Presbyterian Churches in America- 73 churches in the USA
ECO (Covenant Order of Evangelical Presbyterians) - more than 129,765 members, 320 churches and 500 Pastors (2018) - Evangelical, Presbyterian
Evangelical Presbyterian Church - around 122,216 members (2018) - Evangelical, Presbyterian, Charismatic
Korean-American Presbyterian Church - around 53,000 members - Conservative Evangelical, Korean-Presbyterian, Calvinist
National Presbyterian Church in Mexico - around 2,800,000 members  - Conservative Calvinist
Korean Presbyterian Church Abroad - around 55,000 members - Progressive Evangelical, Korean-Presbyterian
Orthodox Presbyterian Church - around 31,472 members (2019)- Orthodox, Presbyterian, Calvinist
Presbyterian Church in America - around 383,338 members (2020) - Evangelical, Presbyterian, Calvinist
Presbyterian Church in Canada - around 225,000 members - Presbyterian
Presbyterian Church (USA) - around 1,193,770 members (2021) - Liberal, Presbyterian
Presbyterian Reformed Church of Mexico - 26,000 members - Orthodox, Presbyterian, Calvinist
Reformed Presbyterian Church of North America - around 7,800 members - Orthodox, Exclusive Psalmody, A cappella, Covenanter, Presbyterian, Calvinist
partially: United Church of Canada - around 388,000 members (as of 12/31/2018) - Liberal, Presbyterian & Congregational & Methodist
World Korean Presbyterian Church - around 300 churches - Conservative Fundamentalist, Korean-Presbyterian, Calvinist

Smaller Presbyterian denominations
American Presbyterian Church - Orthodox, Presbyterian, Calvinist
Covenant Presbyterian Church - Orthodox, Presbyterian, Calvinist
Covenant Reformed Presbyterian Church - Orthodox, 1646 Westminster Confession, Presbyterian, Calvinist
Covenanting Association of Reformed and Presbyterian Churches
Evangel Presbytery - Orthodox, Presbyterian, Calvinist
Faith Presbytery, Bible Presbyterian Church
Federation of Reformed Churches - Orthodox, Presbyterian, Calvinist, Paedocommunion
Free Presbyterian Church - Orthodox, Presbyterian, Calvinist
Independent Presbyterian Church in Mexico - 2,500 members and 35 congregations - Orthodox, Presbyterian, Calvinist
National Conservative Presbyterian Church in Mexico - Orthodox, Presbyterian, Calvinist
Presbyterian Reformed Church - Orthodox, Presbyterian, Calvinist
Puritan Reformed Church
Reformed Presbyterian Church - Hanover Presbytery - Orthodox, Presbyterian, Calvinist
Reformed Presbyterian Church General Assembly - Orthodox, Presbyterian, Calvinist
Reformed Presbytery in North America - Orthodox, Covenanter Presbyterian, Calvinist
Upper Cumberland Presbyterian Church - less than 1000 members - Conservative, Presbyterian, Four-Point Calvinist 
Vanguard Presbytery - Orthodox, Presbyterian, Calvinist

Korean Presbyterian denominations 
Korean-American Presbyterian Church
Korean Presbyterian Church in America (Kosin) 
Korean Presbyterian Church Abroad
Korean Evangelical Presbyterian Church in America
World Korean Presbyterian Church

Scottish Presbyterian denominations 
Free Church of Scotland - has 9 congregations in North America
Free Church of Scotland (Continuing) - has 8 congregations in the USA
Associated Presbyterian Churches - has 1 congregation in Vancouver
Free Presbyterian Church of Scotland - has 3 congregations in the US and Canada

Chart of splits and mergers of North American Presbyterian churches

Congregational denominations
partially: United Church of Canada - around 2,800,000 members - Liberal, Presbyterian & Congregational & Methodist
partially: United Church of Christ - around 802,356 members - Liberal, German Reformed & Congregational
National Association of Congregational Christian Churches - 70,000 members and 400 churches
Conservative Congregational Christian Conference - around 41,000 members - Evangelical, Congregational
Congregational Christian Churches in Canada - around 7,000 members - Evangelical, Congregational
Reformed Bible Church
Evangelical Association of Reformed and Congregational Christian Churches
Reformed Congregational Fellowship

European Reformed denominations

Episcopal/Anglican Reformed denominations
Reformed Episcopal Church - around 13,000 members - Orthodox, Episcopal/Anglican, Calvinistic
Traditional Protestant Episcopal Church - Orthodox, Episcopal/Anglican
Anglican Mission in the Americas
Anglican Church in North America
Reformed Anglican Church
United Episcopal Church of North America

Dutch Reformed denominations
Alliance of Reformed Churches - 125 churches - Evangelical, Conservative, Dutch Reformed, Calvinistic
Christian Reformed Church in North America - around 245,217 members - Evangelical, Conservative, Dutch Reformed, Calvinistic, Egalitarian (women can assume any church office)
Evangelical Reformed Church in America - Conservative, Evangelical, Calvinist, Orthodox, Dutch Reformed
Kingdom Network - 5 churches - Evangelical, Conservative, Dutch Reformed, Calvinistic
Reformed Church in America - around 240,000 members - Liberal & Conservative, Dutch Reformed
United Reformed Churches in North America - around 23,302 members - Orthodox, Dutch Reformed, Calvinistic
Canadian and American Reformed Churches - around 17,729 members - Orthodox, Dutch Reformed, Calvinistic
partially: Communion of Reformed Evangelical Churches - around 15,000 members - Evangelical/Orthodox, Dutch Reformed/Presbyterian, Calvinistic
Netherlands Reformed Congregations - around 10,790 members - Puritan, Dutch Reformed, Calvinistic
Reformed Congregations in North America
Protestant Reformed Churches in America - around 8,055 members - Orthodox, Dutch Reformed, strictly Calvinistic
Free Reformed Churches in North America - around 4,689 members - Orthodox, Dutch Reformed, Calvinistic
Heritage Reformed Congregations - around 2,000 members - Puritan, Dutch Reformed, Calvinistic
Orthodox Christian Reformed Church - around 1,500 members - Orthodox, Dutch Reformed, Calvinistic

German and French Reformed denominations

partially: United Church of Christ - around 1,100,000 members - Liberal, German Reformed & Congregational
French Protestant (Huguenot) Church, Charleston, SC——The only French Calvinist or Huguenot congregation still existing in the United States.
Reformed Church in the United States - around 5,000 members - Orthodox, German Reformed, Calvinistic
L'Église réformée du Québec (Reformed Church of Quebec) - around 500 members - Orthodox, French Reformed, Calvinistic

Other European Reformed denominations
Hungarian Reformed Church of America - around 10,500 members - Conservative, Hungarian Reformed
Calvin Synod - United Church of Christ - around 3,500 members - Conservative, Hungarian Reformed
Lithuanian Evangelical Reformed Church - Liberal, Lithuanian Reformed

Reformed Baptist
Reformed Baptist
Association of Reformed Baptist Churches of America www.arbca.com
Fellowship of Independent Reformed Evangelicals www.firefellowship.org
Primitive Baptists

Reformed Charismatic
Sovereign Grace Churches
Newfrontiers in the United States

Uniting and United denominations
United Church of Canada - around 2,800,000 members - Liberal, Presbyterian & Congregational & Methodist
United Church of Christ - around 802,356 members - Liberal, German Reformed & Congregational
Communion of Reformed Evangelical Churches - around 15,000 members - Evangelical/Orthodox, Dutch Reformed/Presbyterian, Calvinistic

Other
New Calvinism

See also
American Presbyterianism
List of Reformed churches

References

External links
 Reformed-Online
 http://naparc.org/
 https://web.archive.org/web/20141111183209/http://www.tateville.com/churches.html
 http://reformednet.us

 
Reformed